Baliochila lequeuxi, the Lequeux's buff, is a butterfly in the family Lycaenidae. It is found on Mafia Island off of Tanzania.

Adults are on the wing in June, November and January.

References

Butterflies described in 1994
Poritiinae
Endemic fauna of Tanzania
Butterflies of Africa